George Barnes (20 February 1927 – 23 August 2000) born in Temora, New South Wales is an Australian professional light/light welter/welter/middleweight boxer of the 1940s, '50s and '60s who won the Queensland (Australia) State light welterweight title, Australian light welterweight title, Australian welterweight title, and British Empire welterweight title, his professional fighting weight varied from , i.e. lightweight to , i.e. light middleweight. He was inducted into the Australian National Boxing Hall of Fame in 2004.

Professional boxing record

Genealogical information
George Barnes was the son of the boxer Eric Barnes (circa-1897 – 14 May 1978 (aged 81)) who won the Australian middleweight title in 1921 under the name Frank Burns, they were reputedly the first father and son combination to win national titles anywhere in the world George Barnes was the brother of the boxers; Don Barnes , Bill Barnes , and Ron Barnes .

References

External links

Image - George Barnes
Image - George Barnes
Image - George Barnes
Image - George Barnes
George Barnes v Billy Todd Australian Boxing
Knockout bloke and pugilist

1927 births
2000 deaths
Lightweight boxers
Light-welterweight boxers
Middleweight boxers
People from the Riverina
Welterweight boxers
Australian male boxers
Commonwealth Boxing Council champions
Sportsmen from New South Wales